Andrés Ponce Ruiz Jr. (born September 11, 1989) is an American professional boxer. He is a former unified heavyweight champion, having defeated Anthony Joshua to win the WBA (Super), IBF, WBO, and IBO titles in 2019 to become the first male boxer of Mexican heritage  to win a world heavyweight championship.

As of October 2021, he is ranked as the world's fifth-best active heavyweight by ESPN, sixth by the Transnational Boxing Rankings Board and BoxRec, and seventh by The Ring magazine.

Early years
Ruiz was born in Imperial, California; his parents had emigrated from Mexico to the U.S. His father is a former construction worker who started his own business flipping houses. Ruiz had a passion for baseball before his father got him into boxing; he has noted that his first fight was at age seven in San Diego. Ruiz later worked for his father in construction for a time before deciding to become a full-time boxer and starting his amateur career in Mexico. His grandfather owned a boxing gym in Mexicali that was used by featherweight champion Jorge Páez. Ruiz has explained that his nickname, 'Destroyer', was acquired before he started boxing, because as a child, "I was always destroying stuff."

Amateur career
During his amateur career, Ruiz boxed to a 105–5 record under Cuban trainer Fernando Ferrer. His 105 wins include two Mexican National Junior Olympics gold medals and a title at the Ringside World Championships. Ruiz also represented Mexico in two 2008 Beijing Olympic Games qualification tournaments, losing to eventual Olympians Robert Alfonso of Cuba and Óscar Rivas of Colombia in the first and second qualifiers. Ruiz's parents were born in Mexico, making Ruiz eligible to represent Mexico.

World Championships results 
2007
Lost to Michael Hunter (United States) RSCO–3

Pre-Olympic Tournament results 
2007
Lost to Zhang Zhilei (China) 28–9

Mexican National Championships results 
2008
Defeated Jose Luis Castro (Mexico) RSC–3
Defeated Yusett Savala (Mexico) 12–0
Defeated Juan Isidro Hiracheta	(Mexico) AB–2

USA vs Mexico results 
2008
Lost to Mike Colin Wilson (United States) 16–9

American Olympic Qualifications results 
2008
Defeated Gerardo Bisbal (Puerto Rico) 24–7
Lost to Robert Alfonso (Cuba) 7–3

American Olympic Qualifications results 
2008
Defeated German Sandi (Costa Rica) RSC–1
Lost to Óscar Rivas (Colombia) 16–4

Professional career
Ruiz had Freddie Roach in his corner and at the Wild Card Gym and sparred with former UFC heavyweight champion, Andrei Arlovski. Ruiz mostly fought journeymen opposition earlier in his career but did knock out two amateur stars in 2006 US amateur champion Jonte Willis and 2008 Golden Gloves champion Tor Hamer.

Early career
A 19-year-old Ruiz made his professional debut on March 28, 2009, at the Plaza de Toros in Tijuana, Baja California, Mexico, in a four-round bout against Miguel Ramírez. Ruiz won the fight via a first-round knockout (KO). Ruiz fought again after three months at the same venue, this time knocking Ross Brantley down three times in round one, winning the bout via technical knockout (TKO). Ruiz took an eight-month gap before he returned to the ring in February 2010, winning a four-round unanimous decision against Juan Luis Lopez Alcaraz. A month later, Ruiz made his American debut at the Gaylord Hotel in Texas, knocking out Luke Vaughn in round one. Ruiz had his next three fights of 2010 also in the U.S., defeating Miles Kelly via KO, Raymond Lopez via unanimous decision and Francisco Diaz via KO. On February 5, 2011, Ruiz knocked out Kelsey Arnold in the third-round and in the same month defeated Alvaro Morales via unanimous decision 59–55, 59–55, and 60–54. In April 2011, Ruiz defeated Angel Herrera via six-round unanimous decision. In July, Ruiz fought at the Texas Station Casino, Las Vegas, defeating Villi Bloomfield via fourth-round TKO. He returned to the Casino on December 7 and defeated Elijah McCall (11–1–1, 10 KOs), son of former world champion Oliver McCall, by a TKO one second before round three ended. Referee Kenny Bayless waves off the fight after McCall stopped defending himself. Ruiz's hand speed was showcased in this fight.

On March 23, 2012, Ruiz fought his first eight-round fight, outpointing Homero Fonseca. All three judges scored the fight 80–72. In July, Ruiz fought Jonte Willis (8–3–1, 3 KOs) at the Home Depot Center, Carson, California. Willis entered with a record of 1–3–1 in his previous five fights, including a split decision loss three months prior to Denis Bakhtov (33–7). Ruiz floored Willis in round five from a short right hand before referee Wayne Hedgpeth stopped the bout in round eight, after a combination of unanswered punches. This was on the undercard of Donaire vs. Mathebula.

Moving up the ranks
On July 27, 2013 Ruiz traveled to Macau with Top Rank to fight at the Cotai Arena against undefeated 30 year old American Joe Hanks (21-0, 14 KOs) in a scheduled ten round fight. Ruiz dropped Hanks twice in round four with fast right hands, forcing the stoppage. Ruiz claimed the vacant WBO Inter-Continental heavyweight title with this win. On November 24, Ruiz fought again the Cotai Arena, this time on the Pacquiao-Rios undercard, successfully defending his WBO Inter-Continental heavyweight title and claiming the vacant WBC-NABF heavyweight title defeating Tor Hamer (21-2, 14 KOs). The fight was stopped after the third-round when Hamer indicated he did not wish to continue. Over the three rounds, Ruiz landed 74 of 213 punches thrown (35%) and Hamer landed 49 of his 131 thrown (37%) before he quit on his stool. This was the second time Hamer had retired on his stool following his previous loss to Vyacheslav Glazkov in December 2012. His promoter Lou DiBella announced Hamer had been released from his contract.

On December 20, 2014 Ruiz fought former WBO heavyweight champion, 38 year old Siarhei Liakhovich (26-6, 16 KOs) at the Celebrity Theater in Phoenix, Arizona. Ruiz was taken to the ten round distance for the first time in his career by Liakhovich, who trained hard for this fight and tried to win. The scorecards read 98–92, 96–94, and 99–91, all in favour of Ruiz who retained his titles. This was the last time Liakhovich fought. Ruiz revealed he fractured his right hand during the second round. In June 2015, Ruiz began training with well-known trainer Abel Sanchez, whose most notable boxer was Gennady Golovkin.

After a 9-month gap, Ruiz returned to the ring in September 2015 at the Tachi Palace Hotel & Casino in Lemoore, California defeating Joell Godfrey via unanimous decision over eight rounds, all three judges scored it 80–72. Godfrey was a late replacement for Devin Vargas, who was unable to obtain a license from the California Athletic Commission. A month later, Ruiz fought veteran Raphael Zumbano Love (37-11-1, 30 KOs). Ruiz won on points after eight rounds.

On May 14, 2016 Ruiz fought 45 year old, former world title challenger Ray Austin (29-6-4, 18 KOs) at the Sportsman's Lodge in California. Austin weighed 18 pounds more than Ruiz at the weigh-in. This was the first time in 14 professional fights that Ruiz was outweighed by his opponent. This was Ruiz's fourth successful defence of his WBC-NABF heavyweight title as Austin was down in round one, he injured his right hand and failed to come out of his corner for round five. After this bout, Ruiz increased his record to 27 wins in as many fights.

Ruiz fought on July 16 against 42 year old Josh Gormley (22-4, 21 KOs) at the Masonic Temple in Michigan. Promoted by Salita Promotions. Ruiz won the fight via third-round TKO.

Ruiz next fought on September 10, 2016 returning to the Tachi Palace Hotel & Casino in California to headline "Solo Boxeo Tecate" (UniMas) against 40 year old Franklin Lawrence (21-2-2, 16 KOs) for the WBC-NABF heavyweight title. Lawrence has won his last nine fights inside the distance dating back to 2009, with his last loss being against veteran Oliver McCall. His only other loss came in his fifth professional fight against future WBC world champion Bermane Stiverne, which was stopped after Lawrence injured his arm in round one. Ruiz made a successful fifth defence of his WBC-NABF title after ten one-sided rounds. The judges scored the fight 100–90, 99–91, and 99–91. The win also set up a future WBO eliminator with bout with Hughie Fury.

It was announced after the Lawrence fight that Ruiz would fight Hughie Fury in the UK on October 29 at the Manchester Arena, on the undercard of the cancelled rematch between Tyson Fury and Wladimir Klitschko. The winner would be the mandatory challenger for the WBO heavyweight title. Two weeks later, it was reported that Ruiz had withdrawn because he did not want the fight.

WBO heavyweight title shot

Ruiz vs. Parker

Ruiz was ordered to fight Joseph Parker in New Zealand for the WBO heavyweight title with the fight set to take place on December 10, 2016. This fight came about by Ruiz being one of the top two ranked contenders willing to fight for the vacant title. The title became vacant when former champion Tyson Fury vacated the title.

Discussions and negotiations began after Fury was expected to be stripped of his WBO belt over inactivity and testing positive for cocaine. With his sudden announcement that he would relinquish his heavyweight world title belts due to his various issues, it was unclear exactly how the WBO and WBA would go about filling the vacancies. But before Fury vacated, Duco Events promoter Dean Lonergan announced in early October he had been negotiating an alternative WBO title fight against Ruiz, suggesting he had a chance of reaching a deal with Bob Arum. He pointed out that the WBO rules stated the two best-classified contenders will challenge for the title. Arum told ESPN.com that he was in talks with the WBO about making it for the vacant title.

Ruiz failed to become the first heavyweight of Mexican ancestry to win a world title when Parker won the bout by a majority decision. The judges scored the fight 114–114, 115–113, and 115–113. Ruiz started off well being the aggressor but slowed down during mid rounds, only to take control again during the championship rounds. Both men showed respect for each other throughout the contest. After the fight, Ruiz said, "I think I got the win or at least a draw, I think I set the pace with my jab." Ruiz said he wanted a rematch. CompuBox stats showed that Parker landed 119 of 560 punches thrown (21%) and Ruiz landed 107 of his 416 thrown (26%). On a delayed HBO broadcast, the fight peaked at 585,000 viewers, with an average of 521,000 viewers.

Winning streak in 2018–2019

Ruiz vs. Vargas 
On December 19, 2017 Angel "Memo" Heredia, a well known strength and conditioning trainer, confirmed that he would be working alongside Ruiz. Ruiz was next to make a ring return on February 3, 2018 on the undercard of Gilberto Ramirez vs. Habib Ahmed WBO super middleweight title fight at the American Bank Center in Corpus Christi, Texas. Ruiz did not appear on the card and instead his return was pushed back to take place at the StubHub Center in Carson, California on the undercard of Óscar Valdez vs. Scott Quigg on March 10. In his absence from the ring, he explained, "I just wanted to take a break. I already have 30 fights. I wanted to be with the family, I started investing my money. I started building houses. But every boxers needs that little break and now I've got to come back harder." American boxer Devin Vargas (20-4, 8 KOs) was confirmed as his opponent in a scheduled eight round bout. Ruiz knocked Vargas out in round one. He landed a big right hand to the head of Vargas, dropping him. Referee Thomas Taylor called off the fight. The official time of the stoppage was at 1:38 of round one. Ruiz showed good power and speed during the short fight. For the bout, Ruiz trained with Manny Robles. Ruiz received a $500,000 purse.

Ruiz vs. Johnson 
His next fight was scheduled to take place on July 7, 2018 at the Save Mart Center in Fresno, California against veteran journeyman Kevin Johnson (32-9-1, 16 KOs). The main goal for this bout was for Ruiz to get in some much needed rounds, having only completed less than a round in over a year. Johnson, who had previously only been stopped twice in his nine losses, was known for his toughness, having taken the likes of Kubrat Pulev, Derek Chisora, Tyson Fury and Vitali Klitschko the twelve round distance. Ruiz dominated Johnson over ten rounds, winning via unanimous decision with scores of 99–91, 97–93, and 97–93. Johnson did not do much apart from throw a strong jab from time to time. It was Ruiz who was busy and remained in control for majority of the bout. Ruiz admitted it was good to go the distance and called out some of the better heavyweights, namely Jarrell Miller.

Ruiz vs. Dimitrenko
On January 11, 2019, it was reported that Ruiz had signed a deal with powerful advisor Al Haymon, and would now be part of the Premier Boxing Champions (PBC) stable, with his fights being aired on Showtime and FOX. It was said that Ruiz had bought out the remainder of his Top Rank promotional contract. On March 7, Ruiz's PBC debut was announced to take place on the Danny García vs. Adrián Granados undercard on April 20 at the Dignity Health Sports Park in Carson, California against 36 year old German boxer Alexander Dimitrenko (41-4, 26 KOs) in a ten-round bout. The fight was televised on FOX and FOX Deportes. For the fight, Ruiz weighed 262 pounds and Dimitrenko came it at 259 pounds. Ruiz was guaranteed a $200,000 purse, whilst Dimitrenko was guaranteed $75,000. Using his quick hands and combinations, Ruiz was able to overcome Dimitrenko via TKO in round five. The bout nearly came to an end in round four when Ruiz nearly knocked Dimitrenko down, however Dimitrenko managed to make it to the end of the round. Ruiz landed 68 punches overall, compared to Dimitrenko, who landed 21 punches. For his next fight, Ruiz wanted to fight Adam Kownacki.

Unified heavyweight champion

Ruiz vs. Joshua 

Prior to the Dimitrenko fight, Ruiz put his name forward to replace Jarrell Miller and challenge Anthony Joshua (22-0, 21 KOs) for the unified WBA (Super), IBF, WBO, and IBO heavyweight titles on June 1, 2019, after Miller was denied a license by the New York Athletic Commission because he failed three different tests for PEDs. On April 22, Ruiz confirmed his team had a meeting scheduled with promoter Eddie Hearn, officially putting himself in the running. Ruiz became a frontrunner after it was reported Luis Ortiz's team had rejected two offers of career-high purses to fight Joshua. Terms were agreed within a week. On May 1, with one month to go before fight night, Joshua vs. Ruiz was confirmed and announced to take place at Madison Square Garden in New York City, broadcast exclusively on DAZN in the United States and on PPV Sky Sports Box Office in the United Kingdom.

On June 1, Ruiz defeated Joshua by technical knockout in the seventh-round, capturing the unified WBA (Super), IBF, WBO, and IBO titles. The first two rounds of the fight were relatively slow, with both men feeling each other out. In the third round, Joshua knocked Ruiz to the canvas, which was the first time Ruiz had suffered a knockdown in his career. Ruiz rose to his feet, seemingly unfazed by Joshua's power, and quickly continued to attack. Mere moments after having hit the canvas himself, Ruiz responded with a succession of heavy punches; despite hitting Ruiz with repeated jabs to the face, Joshua was caught off guard by a left hook to the temple which visibly staggered him, after which Ruiz knocked him down. Joshua was able to get back up, but did not respond as aggressively as Ruiz had, instead choosing to remain on the defensive. Just before the end of round three, Ruiz again managed to fell a disoriented Joshua after forcing him into a corner and unleashing a series of power punches.

Rounds four through six consisted of minor exchanges between Ruiz and Joshua. In round seven, Ruiz knocked Joshua down once again with a short sequence of heavy blows. Joshua managed to get back on his feet again before being floored for a fourth and final time. Almost immediately after dropping to the canvas, Joshua spat out his mouthpiece before rising, turned away from the referee, and walked somewhat unsteadily back to his corner. Joshua then faced the referee with his arms resting on the ropes. Disoriented and hesitant to continue the match, Joshua's responses to questioning were deemed insufficient, resulting in the referee waving off the fight. The referee subsequently awarded Ruiz a seventh-round technical knockout victory, making him the first Mexican-American and second Hispanic heavyweight champion in boxing history after John Ruiz (who has no relation to Andy Ruiz). At the time of stoppage, Ruiz was leading the fight 57–56 on two scorecards and Joshua was leading 57–56 on the other. It is considered to be one of the biggest upsets in the history of boxing.

Ruiz vs. Joshua II 

In September 2019 it was announced that Ruiz would defend his titles against Joshua in a rematch. The fight broke the UK PPV record, totaling 1.575 million buys in the UK. The fight was a low-key affair in which Joshua mainly stayed behind his jab. Joshua boxed a disciplined fight, keeping Ruiz at a distance with his jab and using lateral movement to avoid trading punches up close as he had in their first encounter. He started off well, landing a sharp right hand in the first round that cut Ruiz to the side of his left eye. Joshua continued to box economically and land the more meaningful punches. Ruiz had some success when he tagged Joshua to the head and body at the end of the fourth round, but Joshua remained firmly in control of the action. Ruiz lost the fight via unanimous decision, with the three judges scoring the bout 118–110, 118–110, and 119–109. In his post-fight interview, Ruiz admitted that he hadn't trained diligently for the fight, stating, "I should have taken this fight more seriously. Three months of partying and celebrating affected me." In addition, he showed respect to Joshua, saying "Anthony Joshua did a hell of a job."

Post-title career

Ruiz vs. Arreola 
In his first fight since losing his world titles, Ruiz faced former WBC title challenger Chris Arreola on Fox PPV on May 1, 2021.  This was his first fight with his new trainer Eddy Reynoso in his corner. Ruiz recovered from a second round knockdown to win a unanimous decision with scores of 118–109, 118–109, 117–110.

Ruiz vs. Ortiz 
Sixteen months after defeating Chris Arreola, Ruiz returned to the ring on September 4, 2022 in Los Angeles to face former WBA interim heavyweight champion Luis Ortiz in an eliminator for the WBC title. Despite being outboxed by Ortiz for portions of the fight, Ruiz dropped his opponent three times, twice in the second round and once in the seventh. The knockdowns proved to be decisive, with the judges scoring the bout 114–111, 114–111 and 113–112 in Ruiz's favor. Former WBC champion Deontay Wilder had been in attendance, and both Ruiz and Wilder welcomed the prospect of facing each other.

Personal life
Ruiz resides in his hometown of Imperial, California; he graduated from Imperial High School in 2007 Ruiz considers himself both American and Mexican and identifies with both nationalities: "America's one of the greatest countries in the world. For me, I'm an American and I'm a Mexican. I live here. And it hurts me the way a lot of people talk about Mexicans when I know we're all about hard work and dedication." He is fluent in both English and Spanish.

Professional boxing record

Pay-per-view bouts

Professional boxing

See also
List of world heavyweight boxing champions
List of Mexican boxing world champions

Footnotes

References

External links

1989 births
Living people
American male boxers
American boxers of Mexican descent
World heavyweight boxing champions
World Boxing Association champions
International Boxing Federation champions
World Boxing Organization champions
International Boxing Organization champions
Mexican male boxers
Boxers from California